Flight 205 may refer to:

Austral Líneas Aéreas Flight 205, crashed on 16 January 1959
RwandAir Flight 205, crashed on 12 November 2009

0205